Kelso Township is one of fourteen townships in Dearborn County, Indiana. As of the 2010 census, its population was 2,341 and it contained 919 housing units.

History
Kelso Township is one of the original townships of Dearborn County that also included what is now Jackson Township. Kelso Township was organized in the November 1826 session of the County Supervisors. Kelso Township was named for John Kelso, an Irish immigrant and pioneer settler.

In 1832 Jackson Township was created from the western portion of Kelso Township.

Geography

Town
 Saint Leon

Unincorporated towns
 Dover
 New Alsace
(This list is based on USGS data and may include former settlements.)

Major highways
  Interstate 74
  Indiana State Road 1
  Indiana State Road 46

Cemeteries
The township contains three cemeteries: Colwell-Huber-Briggs, Saint John's and Saint Pauls.

References
 
 United States Census Bureau cartographic boundary files

External links

 Indiana Township Association
 United Township Association of Indiana

Townships in Dearborn County, Indiana
Townships in Indiana
1826 establishments in Indiana
Populated places established in 1826